Hannibal is a latinization (Hanníbas) of the Carthaginian masculine given name , meaning "Baal is Gracious". Its continued use in later times and cultures ever since is caused mainly by the historical fame of the Carthaginian leader Hannibal, who commanded its forces during the Second Punic War.

"Hannibal" may refer to:

Carthaginians 

 Hannibal (247–183/182 BC), general who fought the Roman Republic in the Second Punic War
 Hannibal Gisco (died 258 BC), military commander in the First Punic War
 Hannibal Mago (died 406 BC), shofet (magistrate) of Carthage in 410 BC
 Hannibal Monomachus, friend and staff officer of the Second Punic War general Hannibal
 Hannibal the Rhodian, ship captain during the siege of Lilybaeum in the First Punic War
 Hannibal (Mercenary War) (died 238 BC), general during the Mercenary War

Others 
 Hannibal Mejbri (born 2003), Tunisian footballer 
 Hannibal Buress (born 1983), American comedian from Chicago
 Hannibal Day (1804–1891), Union army officer during the American Civil War
 Hannibal Muammar Gaddafi, son of former Libyan leader Muammar Gaddafi
 Hannibal Hamlin (1809–1891), Abraham Lincoln's first vice president
 Hannibal Kimball (1832–1895), American entrepreneur
 Hannibal Hawkins Macarthur (1788–1861), Australian colonist, politician, businessman and wool pioneer
 Hannibal Navies (born 1977), American National Football League player
 Hannibal Potter (1592–1664), English clergyman and President of Trinity College, Oxford
 Hannibal Price (1841–1893), Haitian diplomat and author
 Hannibal Sehested (council president) (1842–1924), Danish Council president
 Hannibal Sehested (governor) (1609–1666), Danish Governor of Norway
 Hannibal Valdimarsson (1903–1991), Icelandic politician

Fiction 
 Hannibal King, Nightstalker and Vampire Hunter in Blade Trinity and The Tomb of Dracula comics.
 Hannibal Lecter, cannibal
 John "Hannibal" Smith, leader of the A-Team

See also
 Aníbal (name), Spanish/Portuguese equivalent

Modern names of Hebrew origin
Hebrew masculine given names
English masculine given names
Theophoric names